This is a list of notable Urdu-language writers.

A 
 Allama Rashid ul Khairi
 Akbar Allahabadi
 Ali Akbar Natiq
 Maikash Akbarabadi
 Akhtar Orenvi
 Akhtar Sheerani
 Ada Jafri
 Aizaz Ahmad Azar
 Jamiluddin Aali
 Ghulam Abbas
 Khwaja Ahmad Abbas
 Mirza Adeeb
 Chaudhry Afzal Haq
 Wazir Agha
 Anwaar Ahmad
 Aziz Ahmad
 Ashfaq Ahmed
 Faruqi Nisar Ahmed
 Ahmad Nadeem Qasmi
 Saeed Ahmad Akhtar
 Waheed Akhtar
 Amjad Islam Amjad
 Majeed Amjad
 Rasheed Amjad
 Mir Amman
 Rais Amrohvi
 Satyapal Anand
 Sahar Ansari
 Syed Amin Ashraf
 Syed Waheed Ashraf
 Hasan Askari
 Abul Hasan Ali Hasani Nadwi
 Abul Kalam Azad
 Idris Azad
 Jagan Nath Azad
 Muhammad Husain Azad
 Abdul Hameed
 Ayub Sabir
 Amjad Parvez

B 

 Bekal Utsahi
 Obaidullah Baig
 Fatima Surayya Bajia
 Ahmad Bashir
 Rajinder Singh Bedi
 Begum Akhtar Riazuddin
 Abdaal Bela
 Patras Bokhari
 Baba Mohammad Yahya Khan

C 

 Mohinder Pratap Chand
 Krishan Chander
 Harcharan Chawla
 Ismat Chughtai
 Kausar Chandpuri

D 

 Ehsan Danish
 Khwaja Mir Dard
 Deputy Nazir Ahmad Dehlvi
 Abdul Qavi Desnavi
 Attash Durrani

E

 Jaun Elia

F 

 Faiz Ahmed Faiz
 Farhat Ishtiaq
 Fouzia Bhatti
 Ahmed Faraz
 Bushra Farrukh
 Aslam Farrukhi
 Shamsur Rahman Faruqi
 Mehr Lal Soni Zia Fatehabadi
 Farman Fatehpuri
 Niaz Fatehpuri
 Kanwal Feroze
 Bhupendra Nath Kaushik "Fikr"
  Maulana Fuzail Ahmad Nasiri “Ambar”

G 

 Altaf Gauhar
 Mirza Ghalib
 Firaq Gorakhpuri
 Majnoon Gorakhpuri
 Tahir Aslam Gora

H 
 Altaf Hussain Hali
 Muhammad Hamidullah
 Maulvi Abdul Haq
 Shan-ul-Haq Haqqee
 Zahida Hina
 Panchakshari Hiremath
 Ashfaq Hussain
 Intizar Hussain
 Rafiq Hussain
 Qurratulain Hyder
 Hashim Nadeem
 Hasrat Mohani
 Hasrat Mithrvi

I 

 Muhammad Ilyas
 Ibn-e-Insha
 Ibrahim Jalees
 Muhammad Iqbal
 Ibn-e-Safi]            
 Ismail Mirthi

J 
 Jigar Moradabadi
 Jaun Elia
 Ali Sardar Jafri
 Habib Jalib
 Jameel Jalibi
 Khalid Jawed

K 
 Mazhar Kaleem
 Abul Khair Kashfi
 Agha Shorish Kashmiri
 Nasir Kazmi
 Khalique Ibrahim Khalique
 Ghulam Mustafa Khan
 Muhammad Khan
 Maulana Wahiduddin Khan
 Syed Ahmed Khan
 Zafar Ali Khan
 Dushyant Kumar
 Khan Shein Kunwar
Kanhaiya Lal Kapoor

M 
 Maghfoor Ahmad Ajazi
 Maulana Ghulam Rasool Mehr
 Mohammad Ali Jauhar
 Mubarak Ali
 Josh Malihabadi
 Arsh Malsiani
 Saadat Hasan Manto
 Anwar Maqsood
 Hajra Masroor
 Khadija Mastoor
 Abul Ala Maududi
 Mohsin Mighiana
 Mir Taqi Mir
 Janbaz Mirza
 Momin Khan Momin
 Mumtaz Mufti
 Mohsinul Mulk
 Makhdoom Mohiuddin
 Mohiuddin Qadri Zore
 Majaz

N 
 Naseem Hijazi
 Tahir Naqvi
 Gopi Chand Narang
 Mir Gul Khan Nasir
 Zehra Nigah
 Shibli Nomani
 Asif Noorani
 Naeem Baig
 Ghulam-us-Saqlain Naqvi
 Moeen Nizami
 Mohiuddin Nawab
 Nimra Ahmed Khan

P 
 Munshi Premchand

Q 

 Ghulam Muhammad Qasir
 Ahmad Nadeem Qasmi
 Attaul Haq Qasmi
 Bano Qudsia
 Haider Qureshi
 Qudratullah Shahab
 Ahfaz ur Rahman
 Razia Butt
 Bushra Rahman
 Hakim Syed Zillur Rahman
 Shakeelur Rahman
 Shafiq ur Rahman
 Samina Raja
 Malik Ram
 Noon Meem Rashid
 Fahmida Riaz
 Abbas Rizvi
 Khurshid Rizvi
 Mirza Muhammad Hadi Ruswa
 Rauf Parekh
 Qamar Siddiqui

S 
 Syed Sajjad Haider Yaldram
 Saeed Ahmad Akbarabadi
 Syed Azhar Shah Qaiser
 Shaukat Thanvi
 Sulaiman Nadvi
 Agha Sadiq
 Ibne Safi
 Ghazi Salahuddin
 Akhtar Raza Saleemi
 Mirza Sauda
 Qasim Mahmood
 Mahmood Shaam
 Qudratullah Shahab
 Saif Ahmad
 Abdul Halim Sharar
 Qateel Shifai
 Abul Lais Siddiqui
 Rasheed Ahmad Siddiqi
 Shaukat Siddiqui
 Parveen Shakir
 Sayyid Ahmedullah Qadri

T 
Umrao Tariq

U 
Umera Ahmad

W 
 Wahab Ashrafi
 Muzaffar Warsi
 Raees Warsi
 Raza Naqvi Wahi
 Wasif Ali Wasif

Y 

 Mushtaq Ahmad Yusufi

Z 
 Zafar Ali Khan
 Razia Sajjad Zaheer
 Sajjad Zaheer
 Anwer Zahidi
 Ali Jawad Zaidi 
 Mustafa Zaidi
 Ibrahim Zauq
 Kanwal Ziai

See also 
 Urdu-language literature
 List of Urdu-language poets
 List of Pakistani writers
 List of Pakistani poets
 List of Hindi-language authors
List of Urdu language novelists

References 

Lists of writers by language